The 1999 Biathlon Junior World Championships was held in Pokljuka, Slovenia from February 17 to February 21, 1999. There was to be a total of 8 competitions: sprint, pursuit, individual, and relay races for men and women.

Medal winners

Junior Women

Junior Men

Medal table

References 

Biathlon Junior World Championships
1999 in biathlon
1999 in Slovenian sport
International sports competitions hosted by Slovenia
1999 in youth sport